Samuel Freiherr von Cocceji (pronounced kok-'tse-yi) (20 October 1679 – 4 October 1755) was a German official from the Electorate of the Palatinate who served Brandenburg-Prussia. He was the son of Heinrich von Cocceji.

Cocceji was born in Heidelberg. By 1702 he was a professor at Viadrina University in Frankfurt (Oder) in the Kingdom of Prussia. By 1723 he was Kammergerichtspräsident (president of the superior court of justice), from 1738-39 he was chairman of the Prussian justice department, and by 1747 he was Großkanzler (grand chancellor). King Frederick II of Prussia appointed Cocceji to lead the legal reorganization of annexed Silesia. Cocceji subsequently reformed the legal system of all of Prussia.

Works

Notes

References

External links 

1679 births
1755 deaths
Jurists from Heidelberg
People from the Electoral Palatinate
Justice ministers of Prussia
Academic staff of European University Viadrina
18th-century jurists